The 2018 United States Senate election in New Mexico took place on November 6, 2018, to elect a member of the United States Senate to represent the state of New Mexico, concurrently with other elections to the United States Senate, elections to the United States House of Representatives, and various state and local elections.

Incumbent Democratic Senator Martin Heinrich won re-election to a second term. His opponents were Republican nominee and businessman Mick Rich and Libertarian nominee Gary Johnson, a two-term Republican Governor of New Mexico and two-time candidate for President of the United States.

The candidate filing deadline was March 13, 2018. The Republican and Democratic primary elections were held June 5, 2018. Johnson's results were the highest results for a Libertarian candidate in New Mexico history.

Democratic primary

Candidates

Declared
 Martin Heinrich, incumbent U.S. Senator

Results

Republican primary

Candidates

Declared
 Mick Rich, businessman

Declined
 Aubrey Dunn Jr., New Mexico Commissioner of Public Lands and candidate for NM-02 in 2008 (ran as a Libertarian, later endorsed Gary Johnson)
 Steve Pearce, U.S. Representative, candidate for the U.S. Senate in 2000 and nominee for the U.S. Senate in 2008 (ran for Governor)
 Susana Martinez, Governor of New Mexico

Results

Libertarian primary
On July 30, 2018, nominee Aubrey Dunn withdrew from the race. On August 4, former governor Gary Johnson was formally nominated by the Libertarian Party of New Mexico as Dunn's replacement. Johnson accepted his party's nomination on August 13.

Candidates

Declared
 Gary Johnson, former Governor of New Mexico, Libertarian nominee for president in 2012 and 2016

Withdrew nomination
 Aubrey Dunn Jr., New Mexico Commissioner of Public Lands

Results

General election

Debates
 Complete video of debate, October 12, 2018

Endorsements

Predictions

^Highest rating given

Polling

Graphical summary

Polls 

with Mick Rich

with Gary Johnson

with Aubrey Dunn

Results

County results

Counties that flipped from Republican to Democratic
 Hidalgo (largest municipality: Lordsburg)
 Los Alamos (largest municipality: Los Alamos)
 Sandoval (largest municipality: Rio Rancho)
 Valencia (largest municipality: Los Lunas)

References

External links
 Candidates at Vote Smart
 Candidates at Ballotpedia
 Campaign finance at FEC
 Campaign finance at OpenSecrets

Official campaign websites
 Gary Johnson (L) for Senate
 Martin Heinrich (D) for Senate
 Mick Rich (R) for Senate

2018
New Mexico
United States Senate